John Mills (1806 – 1889), entrepreneur and amateur astronomer, was a manufacturer of Linen and twine in the city of Dundee. As a young man and a member of the Original session Kirk, he had been greatly influenced by the Reverend Thomas Dick, philosopher and author of a number of books on Astronomy and Christian Philosophy. Rev. Dick attempted to harmonize science and religion, and believed that the greatness of God could best be appreciated by the study of astronomy, to which he devoted his life after a period as an ordained minister at Methven. He advocated that every city should have public parks, public libraries and a public observatory.
Inspired by Rev. Thomas Dick, he built his own private observatory on the slopes of Dundee Law, near what is now Adelaide Place. An old print still exists showing the ruins of the building minus its dome. One of John Mills' telescope is still on display in the Visitor Centre attached to the Royal Observatory, Edinburgh.

See also
Mills Observatory

1806 births
1889 deaths
Scientists from Dundee
Scottish astronomers
Businesspeople from Dundee
19th-century Scottish businesspeople